Twinnies was a musical duo from Bavaria consisting of Astrid Paster and Franziska Pauli. They were noted for singing and playing their accordions while rollerblading.

Biography 
Astrid Paster and Franziska Pauli lived in the small Bavarian village of Neufang, which had only 40 inhabitants. They played guitar and steirische harmonikas since childhood. They said that they were such good friends that they could be considered twins.

The duo demonstrated the unique talent of performing while rollerblading. They explained: "The idea came about by accident. We used to perform music in the evenings at Astrid's father's health resort hotel, and [once] while we were out on rollerskates in the middle of the day, the guests asked us to take our accordions out". It was at that hotel that they were discovered by DJ Ötzi's producer Christian Seitz. As he said, "[t]he girls were so brilliant that I signed them the same evening".

On March 6, 2009, the Twinnies (then aged 12 and 13) released their debut album Wir rocken auf Rollen ("We Rock on Rolls") on Sony BMG. The album contained songs written for them by DJ Ötzi's producers Seitz and Martin Neumeyer. Franciska explained: "We told the two which topics we would like to sing about. That included our passion for long talks, as well as fashion and karaoke parties".

On March 7, 2009, they debuted on television, on the ARD folk music program Musikantenstadl. Their performance (with accordions on rollerblades) brought them instant fame. A video of the duo on that day's show (they sang a song "Bayernmädels" from their debut album) is now popular on YouTube, having attracted over 14 million views by the end of 2017.

Members  
The members of the group were:
 Astrid Paster (born May 20, 1996)
 Franziska Pauli (born November 24, 1995)

Discography

Studio albums

References

External links 
 Official website (archived on October 30, 2014)
 Twinnies biography at Sony Music Entertainment Germany GmbH (archived on February 15, 2011)
 Franziska Pauli on YouTube
 Astrid Paster on YouTube

German musical duos